Tell al-Rimah is a tell, or archaeological settlement mound, in Nineveh Province (Iraq). Its ancient name may have been either Karana or Qattara.

History of archaeological research
The site covers an area roughly 500 meters by 500 meters, surrounded by a polygonal city wall. The interior holds a number of low mounds and a large central mound 30 meters high and 100 meters in diameter.

The region was originally surveyed by Seton Lloyd in 1938. The site of Tell al-Rimah was excavated from 1964 to 1971 by a British School of Archaeology in Iraq team led by David Oates. A large temple and palace from the early second millennium BCE were excavated, as well as a Neo-Assyrian building. Tell al-Rimah also is known for having a third millennium example of brick vaulting.

Occupation history
While it appears that the site was occupied in the third millennium BCE, it reached its greatest size and prominence during the second millennium BCE and in the Neo-Assyrian period. The second millennium activity was primarily during the Old Babylonian and Mitanni periods. At various times, Tell al-Rimah has been linked with either Qatara or Karana, both cites known to be in that area during the second millennium. A notable find was a large archive of letters of Iltani, daughter of Samu-Addu, king of Karana.

Material culture

A number of Old Babylonian tablets contemporary with Zimri-Lim of Mari and 40 tablets from the time of Shalmaneser I were found as well as other objects. The most notable artifact found was the stele of Adad-nirari III which mentioned an early king of Northern Israel as "Jehoash the Samarian" and contains the first cuneiform mention of Samaria by that name.

Gallery

See also

Cities of the ancient Near East
Short chronology timeline

References

Further reading
Carolyn Postgate, David Oates and Joan Oates, The Excavations at Tell al Rimah: The Pottery, Aris & Phillips, 1998, 
Stephanie Dalley, C.B.F Walker and J.D. Hawkins. The Old Babylonian Tablets from Al-Rimah, British School of Archaeology in Iraq, 1976, 
Stephanie Dalley, Mari and Karana: Two Old Babylonian Cities, Gorgias Press, 2002 
C. B. F. Walker, A Foundation-Inscription from Tell al Rimah, Iraq, vol. 32, no. 1, pp. 27–30, 1970
LANGLOIS, A.-I. (2017). Archibab 2. Les archives de la princesse Iltani découvertes à Tell al-Rimah (XVIIIe
siècle av. J.-C.) et l’histoire du royaume de Karana/Qaṭṭara. Mémoires de NABU 18. Paris: SEPOA
J. N. Postgate, A Neo-Assyrian Tablet from Tell al Rimah, Iraq, vol. 32, no. 1, pp. 31–35, 1970
Stephanie Dalley, Old Babylonian Trade in Textiles at Tell al Rimah, Iraq, vol. 39, no. 2, pp. 155–159, 1977
Joan Oates, Late Assyrian Temple Furniture from Tell al Rimah, Iraq, vol. 36, no. 1/2, pp. 179–184, 1974
Barbara Parker, Middle Assyrian Seal Impressions from Tell al Rimah, Iraq, vol. 39, no. 2, pp. 257–268, 1977

External links
Rimah digital tablets at CDLI

Rimah
Rimah
Rimah